Theresa Allore was a nineteen year old Canadian college student who disappeared on Friday, November 3, 1978, from Champlain College Lennoxville in the Eastern Townships of Quebec.

Circumstances 
Theresa Allore was a nineteen year old student at Champlain College Lennoxville, Quebec, Canada. Her lodgings were in Compton, a fifteen minute drive south. On November 3, 1978, she disappeared from the campus. Five months later, on April 13, 1979, her body was discovered in a small body of water approximately one kilometre from her dormitory residence in Compton, Quebec. She was wearing only her underwear. Upon her disappearance police initially suggested she was a runaway. When her body was discovered police then suggested that she was the possible victim of a drug overdose, perhaps with the assistance of fellow college students.

Developments 
In the summer of 2002, the family of Allore enlisted the support of an investigative reporter and friend, Patricia Pearson, who produced a series of articles for Canada's National Post newspaper that presented compelling evidence that she was a victim of murder, and that her death was possibly linked to multiple other unsolved local cases. The theory was supported by geographic profiler and then FBI consultant, Kim Rossmo, who suggested a serial sexual predator may have been operating in the Quebec region in the late 1970s and advised police to investigate the deaths as a series.
Since 2002, Theresa's brother, John Allore—who produces the podcast, Who Killed Theresa?—has continued the investigation, identifying dozens of other unsolved murders and disappearances from 1971 to 1981 which may be associated. He successfully lobbied for the creation of a Sûreté du Québec cold case unit, which was created in 2004. Beginning in 2018, John Allore started to focus on other Quebec cases from the 1970s through the present era, cases that further suggest systemic failures in Quebec criminal justice. On January 17, 2019 the Montreal police, the Service de police de la Ville de Montréal, announced it was creating its own cold case squad, in large part due to the lobbying efforts of John Allore. In November 2018 John Allore was awarded the Senate of Canada’s Sesquicentennial Medal for his work in victims advocacy for "recognition of your valuable service to the nation." The book Wish You Were Here about the unsolved murder of Theresa Allore was published by Penguin Random House Canada in September 2020.

See also
List of solved missing person cases
List of unsolved murders

References

Literature

External links

Who Killed Theresa? The Podcast

1970s missing person cases
1978 crimes in Canada
1978 deaths
1978 in Quebec
Deaths by person in Canada
Formerly missing people
Murder in Quebec
Missing person cases in Canada
Unsolved murders in Canada
Women in Quebec